The men's 10,000 metres event at the 1986 Commonwealth Games was held on 26 July 1986 at the Meadowbank Stadium in Edinburgh.

Results

References

Athletics at the 1986 Commonwealth Games
1986